Marooned with Ed Stafford is a documentary television series commissioned by Discovery Channel and produced by Tigress Productions, part of the Endemol Shine Group. Ed Stafford films the series, in which he journeys to remote destinations around the world for ten days each to see if he can survive there on his own in solitude with no clothes (first series only), no food, and no tools. He can only take his camera, an emergency satellite phone and an emergency medical kit. Stafford's goal is to see if he can not only survive, but thrive under these tough conditions.

The first series, Ed Stafford: Naked and Marooned, sees Stafford spend sixty days on the uninhabited tropical island of Olorua in the Pacific Ocean.

Episodes

Series overview

Series 1 (2013)

Series 2 (2014)

Series 3 (2016)

Broadcast
  In the United Kingdom, the series airs first on Discovery Channel, with reruns airing on DMAX.
  The series airs on Discovery Channel in the United States as Naked Castaway.
  In Italy, the series airs on DMAX with a different episodes timeline as Ed Stafford: Duro a morire (Italian for "Ed Stafford: Die-Hard").
  In Germany, the series airs on DMAX with a different episodes timeline as Ed Stafford: Das nackte Überleben (German for "Ed Stafford: Naked Survival").

References

External links
 Episode List

2013 British television series debuts
British television documentaries
Discovery Channel original programming
Documentary films about nature
Nature educational television series
Works about survival skills
Nudity in television
2016 British television series endings
Television shows filmed in Fiji
Television shows filmed in Botswana
Television shows filmed in Venezuela
Television shows filmed in Australia
Television shows filmed in Romania
Television shows filmed in Malaysia
Television shows filmed in Thailand
Television shows filmed in Rwanda
Television shows filmed in Arizona
Television shows filmed in Mongolia
Television shows filmed in Guatemala
Television shows filmed in Namibia
Television shows filmed in Argentina
Television shows filmed in the Philippines
Television shows filmed in Norway
Television series by Endemol